The Late, Late, Late Show is the first full-length release by North Carolina horror themed punk band the Frankenstein Drag Queens from Planet 13. It was released on Uncle God Damn Records in 1996, and was later re-released as part of the "Little Box of Horrors" box set in 2006, on Restless Records. This was the first album Wednesday 13 entirely produced.
In Europe, while the rest of the Frankenstein Drag Queens from Planet 13 discography was rereleased by People Like You records, The Late, Late, Late Show was at first only reissued by People like you as part of the "Little Box of Horrors" box set.

This album was written within the first two weeks of the band being formed, in March 1996. It was originally set to be named "Cross-Dress", and was to feature the three band members crucified in full drag queen attire on the cover, as a play on words. The other tentative title was "Galactic Chicken Shit", the name of the second track on the record, and was to feature the three band members holding their pet chicken, Omar, on the cover. However, the chicken died before the cover shoot, which caused the final name-change.

The first track consists largely of chicken sound effects and someone, presumably Wednesday 13, talking backwards. When it is played forwards the words, "The chickens are coming for your children, I am the chicken god" can clearly be heard.

Track listing
"Blood, Feathers, Lipstick... The Monologue"  – 1:00
"Galactic Chicken Shit"  – 2:19 "(This is an early version of "Slit My Wrist", seen on Beyond the Valley of the Murderdolls)"
"Hit and Rape"  – 2:11
"I Dismember Mama"  – 2:52
"197666"  – 2:26 (This song also features the vocals of the Confederate Crusader)
"God Damn I Am"  – 3:24
"The Wolfman Stole my Baby"  – 4:42
"13th Commandment"  – 0:44
"Bloodsuckers Anyonomus" - 2:09 
"Kill Miss America" - 2:22
"Count Down...Planet 13" - 4:16
Total Album Length: 28:25

Album credits
Wednesday 13: Guitar, Vocals (Credited as "Transvestite with chicken")
Seaweed: Bass (Credited as "Thing holding dolls, the son of uncle god damn")
Sicko Zero: Drums (Credited as "Galactic Whore 2")

1996 debut albums
Frankenstein Drag Queens from Planet 13 albums